The Sommerfeld model can refer to:

 Bohr–Sommerfeld model
 Drude–Sommerfeld model